Let's Get a Divorce is a 1918 American silent comedy film starring Billie Burke and written for the screen by husband and wife team John Emerson and Anita Loos. The film was produced by the Famous Players-Lasky company and distributed through Paramount Pictures.

The film is based on the popular stage play Divorçons by Victorien Sardou and Émile de Najac.

Plot
As described in a film magazine, Cyprienne Marcey (Burke), who eats, dreams, and writes romance, picks out Henri (Miltern), the brother of her roommate, as the object of her affections. Following their spectacular elopement, Henri's attempt to return to writing is a jolt to her romantic temperament. Seeing in Henri's cousin Adhemar (Kaliz) the soul of romance, she asks Henri for a divorce so that she might marry Adhemar. Henri agrees, but once the clandestine aspect of her love affair with Adhemar is removed, it soon palls on her. On the night before the day set for her divorce she persuades her husband to take her to dinner and away from Adhemar. When the latter breaks into their private dining room with the police, he is denounced by Cyprienne who emphatically states that Henri, her husband, is the only man she ever loved.

Cast
Billie Burke as Madame Cyprienne Marcey
John Miltern as Henri de Prunelles
Pinna Nesbit as Yvonne de Prunelles
Armand Kaliz as Adhemar
Rod La Rocque as Chauffeur
Helen Tracy as Mother Superior
John Merkyl as Calvignac (credited as Wilmuth Merkyl)
Cesare Gravina as Head Waiter

Preservation status
Let's Get a Divorce is considered to be a lost film.

See also
Kiss Me Again (1925)
That Uncertain Feeling (1941)

References

External links

AllMovie.com
Lantern slide and larger version of same
lobby poster,...#2 lobby poster
nicely lithographed poster artwork of Billie Burke, descriptive, on yet another lobby poster(HeritageAuctions, ha)

1918 films
American silent feature films
Lost American films
Paramount Pictures films
American films based on plays
Films based on works by Victorien Sardou
Films directed by Charles Giblyn
1918 comedy films
American black-and-white films
Silent American comedy films
1910s American films
1910s English-language films
Lost comedy films